Zee Ganga is a Bhojpuri general entertainment channel. It was launched by Reliance Broadcast Network Limited (RBNL) as Big Ganga in 2013 but later acquired by ZEEL and they rebranded it as Zee Ganga in 2021. It is the only Bhojpuri channel on DD Free Dish which delivers original content for their viewers.

History
  
On 14 January 2013, Reliance launched a new Bhojpuri channel called Big Magic Bihar & Jharkhand. Later on 15 August 2014, It was rebranded as Big Magic Ganga.  On 1 January 2016, it was again renamed to Big Ganga.

In November 2016, ZEE acquired the two channels of RBNL - Big Magic and Big Ganga. On 20 September 2021, the channel was rebranded as Zee Ganga with introduction of few original Bhojpuri fiction and non-fiction contents.

Current shows

See also
List of Bhojpuri-language television channels

References

Bhojpuri-language television
Television channels and stations established in 2021
Zee Entertainment Enterprises
Television stations in New Delhi
2013 establishments in Delhi